Coondoo is a rural locality in the Gympie Region, Queensland, Australia. In the  Coondoo had a population of 66 people.

History 
Wolvi East Provisional School opened on 27 August 1912 as a half-time school in conjunction with Beenam Range Provisional School (meaning that a single teacher was shared between the two schools). About 1915 or 1916 it became a full-time provisional school. In 1917 it was renamed Coondoo Provisional School. In 1933 it became Coondoo State School. It closed in 1968. It was located on the corner of Kin Kin Road and Stewart Road.

In the  Coondoo had a population of 66 people.

References 

Gympie Region
Localities in Queensland